Bath and North East Somerset (B&NES) is a unitary authority district in England. Bath and North East Somerset Council was created on 1 April 1996 following the abolition of the county of Avon. It is part of the ceremonial county of Somerset.

The unitary authority provides a single tier of local government with responsibility for almost all local government functions within the district, including local planning and building control, local roads, council housing, environmental health, markets and fairs, refuse collection, recycling, cemeteries, crematoria, leisure services, parks, and tourism. It is also responsible for education, social services, libraries, main roads, public transport, trading standards, waste disposal and strategic planning, although fire, police and ambulance services are provided jointly with other authorities through the Avon Fire and Rescue Service, Avon and Somerset Constabulary and the South Western Ambulance Service. Its administrative headquarters is in Bath, though many departments are based at offices in Keynsham. The air ambulance and critical care service is provided by the charity Great Western Air Ambulance Charity.

It stretches from the outskirts of Bristol, south into the Mendip Hills and east to the southern Cotswold Hills and Wiltshire border. The city of Bath is the principal settlement in the district, but B&NES also covers Keynsham, Midsomer Norton, Radstock, Westfield, Saltford and the Chew Valley.

The area has varied geography including river valleys and rolling hills. The history of human habitation is long but expanded massively during Roman times, and played significant roles in the Saxon era and English civil war. Industry developed from a largely agricultural basis to include coal mining with the coming of canals and railways. Bath developed as a spa resort in Georgian times and remains a major cultural tourism centre having gained World Heritage City status.

History
Although B&NES was only created in 1996 the area it covers has been occupied for thousands of years. The age of the henge monument at Stanton Drew stone circles is unknown, but is believed to be from the Neolithic period, as is the chambered tomb known as Stoney Littleton Long Barrow. Solsbury Hill has an Iron Age hill fort. The hills around Bath such as Bathampton Down saw human activity from the Mesolithic period. Several Bronze Age round barrows were opened by John Skinner in the 18th century. Bathampton Camp may have been a univallate Iron Age hill fort or stock enclosure. A long barrow site believed to be from the Beaker people was flattened to make way for RAF Charmy Down.

The archaeological evidence shows that the site of the Roman Baths' main spring was treated as a shrine by the Celts, and was dedicated to the goddess Sulis, whom the Romans identified with Minerva; however, the name Sulis continued to be used after the Roman invasion, leading to Bath's Roman name of Aquae Sulis (literally, "the waters of Sulis").

Excavations carried out before the flooding of Chew Valley Lake also uncovered Roman remains, indicating agricultural and industrial activity from the second half of the first century until the third century AD. The finds included a moderately large villa at Chew Park, where wooden writing tablets (the first in the UK) with ink writing were found. There is also evidence from the Pagans Hill Roman Temple at Chew Stoke, and a villa at Keynsham.

The Saxon advance from the east seems to have been halted by battles between the British and Saxons, for example; at the siege of Badon Mons Badonicus (which may have been in the Bath region e.g. at Solsbury Hill), or Bathampton Down. This area became the border between the Romano-British Celts and the West Saxons following the Battle of Deorham in 577 AD. The Western Wandsdyke was probably built during the 5th or 6th century. The ditch is on the north side, so presumably it was used by the Celts as a defence against Saxons encroaching from the upper Thames valley. According to the Anglo-Saxon Chronicle, the Saxon Cenwalh achieved a breakthrough against the British Celtic tribes, with victories at Bradford-on-Avon (in the Avon Gap in the Wansdyke) in 652 AD. In 675, Osric, King of the Hwicce, set up a monastic house at Bath, probably using the walled area as its precinct. King Offa of Mercia gained control of this monastery in 781 and rebuilt the church, which was dedicated to St. Peter. In the ninth century the old Roman street pattern had been lost and it had become a royal possession, with King Alfred laying out the town afresh, leaving its south-eastern quadrant as the abbey precinct. Edgar of England was crowned king of England in Bath Abbey in 973.

11th to 16th centuries
King William Rufus granted the city to a royal physician, John of Tours, who became Bishop of Wells and Abbot of Bath in 1088. It was papal policy for bishops to move to more urban seats, and he translated his own from Wells to Bath. He planned and began a much larger church as his cathedral, to which was attached a priory, with the bishop's palace beside it. New baths were built around the three springs. Later bishops, however, returned the episcopal seat to Wells, while retaining the name of Bath in their title as the Bishop of Bath and Wells. The priory at Hinton Charterhouse was founded in 1232 by Ela, Countess of Salisbury who also founded Lacock Abbey.

By the 15th century, Bath's abbey church was badly dilapidated and in need of repairs. Oliver King, Bishop of Bath and Wells, decided in 1500 to rebuild it on a smaller scale. The new church was completed just a few years before Bath Priory was dissolved in 1539 by Henry VIII. The abbey church was allowed to become derelict before being restored as the city's parish church in the Elizabethan period, when the city revived as a spa. The baths were improved and the city began to attract the aristocracy. Bath was granted city status by Royal Charter by Queen Elizabeth I in 1590.

Keynsham, said to be named after Saint Keyne, developed into a medieval market town, its growth prompted by the foundation of an influential and prosperous abbey, founded by the Victorine order of Augustinian monks around 1170. It survived until the dissolution of the monasteries in 1539 and a house was built on the site. The remains have been designated as Grade I listed by English Heritage.

17th century onwards
During the English Civil War, Somerset, which was largely Parliamentarian, was the site of a number of important battles between the Royalists and the Parliamentarians. The Battle of Lansdowne was fought on 5 July 1643 on the northern outskirts of the city.

In 1668 Thomas Guidott, who had been a student of chemistry and medicine at Wadham College, Oxford, moved to Bath and set up practice. He became interested in the curative properties of the waters and in 1676 he wrote A discourse of Bathe, and the hot waters there. Also, Some Enquiries into the Nature of the water. This brought the health-giving properties of the hot mineral waters to the attention of the country and soon the aristocracy started to arrive to partake in them. Several areas of the city underwent development during the Stuart period, and this increased during Georgian times in response to increasing numbers of people visiting the spa and resort town and requiring accommodation. The architects John Wood the elder and his son John Wood the younger laid out the new quarters in streets and squares, the identical facades of which gave an impression of palatial scale and classical decorum providing a unique set of buildings and architecture. The creamy gold of Bath stone further unified the city, much of it obtained from the limestone Combe Down and Bathampton Down Mines, which were owned by Ralph Allen (1694–1764). Allen, in order to advertise the quality of his quarried limestone, commissioned the elder John Wood to build him a country house on his Prior Park estate between the city and the mines.

In north Somerset, around Radstock mining in the Somerset coalfield was an important industry, and in an effort to reduce the cost of transporting the coal the Somerset Coal Canal was built; part of it was later converted into a railway. It connected to the Kennet and Avon Canal which linked the River Thames at Reading and the Floating Harbour at Bristol, joining the River Avon at Bath via Bath Locks. The Somerset and Dorset Joint Railway connected Bath and Bournemouth. It was jointly operated by the Midland Railway and the London and South Western Railway (L&SWR).  After the 1 January 1923 Grouping, joint ownership of the S&D passed to the LMS and the Southern Railway.

The area was also served by the Bristol and North Somerset Railway that connected Bristol with towns in the Somerset coalfield. The line was opened in 1873 between Bristol and Radstock, where it joined with an earlier freight-only line from Frome. The biggest civil engineering project on the line was the Pensford Viaduct over the River Chew. The viaduct is 995 feet long, reaches a maximum height of 95 feet to rail level and consists of 16 arches. It is now a Grade II listed building. Freight services on the branch ceased in 1951. The line achieved some fame after closure by its use in the film The Titfield Thunderbolt, but the track was taken up in 1958.

During World War II, between the evening of 25 April and the early morning of 27 April 1942, Bath suffered three air raids in reprisal for RAF raids on the German cities of Lübeck and Rostock. The three raids formed part of the Luftwaffe campaign popularly known as the Baedeker Blitz; over 400 people were killed, and more than 19,000 buildings were damaged or destroyed. Houses in the Royal Crescent, Circus and Paragon were burnt out along with the Assembly Rooms, while the south side of Queen Square was destroyed. All have since been reconstructed.

The River Chew suffered a major flood in 1968 with serious damage to towns and villages along its route, including Chew Stoke, Chew Magna, Stanton Drew, Publow, Woollard, Compton Dando and Chewton Keynsham. The flood even swept away the bridge at Pensford.

Geography
It stretches from the outskirts of Bristol, south into the Mendip Hills and east to the southern Cotswold Hills and Wiltshire border. Surrounding local government areas include Bristol, North Somerset, Somerset, South Gloucestershire, and Wiltshire.

The city of Bath is the principal settlement in the district, but B&NES also covers Keynsham, Midsomer Norton, Radstock and the Chew Valley. Bath lies on the River Avon and its tributaries such as the River Chew and Midford Brook cross the area.

In the west of the area the Chew Valley consists of the valley of the River Chew and is generally low-lying and undulating. It is bounded by higher ground ranging from Dundry Down to the north, the Lulsgate Plateau to the west, the Mendip Hills to the south and the Hinton Blewett, Marksbury and Newton St Loe plateau areas to the east. The River Chew was dammed in the 1950s to create Chew Valley Lake, which provides drinking water for the nearby city of Bristol and surrounding areas. The lake is a prominent landscape feature of the valley, a focus for recreation, and is internationally recognised for its nature conservation interest, because of the bird species, plants and insects.

To the north of Bath are Lansdown, Langridge and Solsbury hills.  These are outliers of the Cotswolds.

Governance

Historically part of the county of Somerset, Bath was made a county borough in 1889 so being independent of the newly created administrative Somerset county council, which covered the rest of the area that became B&NES. The area that would become B&NES became part of Avon when that non-metropolitan county was created in 1974. Since the abolition of Avon in 1996, Bath has been the main centre of the district of Bath and North East Somerset (B&NES), one of the four authorities that replaced Avon County Council and the six district councils of Avon. B&NES covers the combined areas of the non-metropolitan districts (that existed 1974 to 1996) of Wansdyke and Bath.

Before the Reform Act of 1832 Bath elected two members to the unreformed House of Commons. Bath now has a single parliamentary constituency, with Liberal Democrat Wera Hobhouse as Member of Parliament. The rest of the area falls within the North East Somerset constituency. Previously most of the area was in the Wansdyke constituency, which covers the part of B&NES that is not in the Bath constituency. It also contained four wards or parts of wards from South Gloucestershire Council. It was named after the former Wansdyke district.

Since B&NES was created, until 2015, no political party had been in overall control of the council. The Liberal Democrats quickly became the dominant party, but in the local elections on 3 May 2007 the Conservative Party won 31 seats and became the largest party, though they did not have a majority. In the 2011 local elections, the Liberal Democrats and Conservatives won 29 seats each with the Labour Party winning only five seats; the Liberal Democrats went on to form a minority administration. In 2015, the Conservative Party became the first party to secure a majority, with 37 seats. The Liberal Democrats subsequently took majority control of the council in 2019.

The current council composes of 59 councillors, 28 from Bath, 6 each from the Norton Radstock and Keynsham areas, and 19 others. The current political division after the election of May 2019 is:

Local concerns include the building of a new road for buses on Conservation Area land as part of the Bath Transportation Package, the closure of a Bath Secondary School to remove excess places, economic difficulties in the Norton Radstock area, development of the large Western Riverside brownfield land site in Bath, and the now popular, but long delayed Thermae Bath Spa development.  On 10 December 2003, Bath and North East Somerset was granted Fairtrade Zone status.

Between 2000 and 2014, Bath and North East Somerset Council ran a youth democracy group, Democratic Action for B&NES Youth (DAFBY). The group was consulted by the council and its partners on issues that affected young people.

Elected mayor
Following a successful petition, a referendum was held on 10 March 2016 proposing a directly elected mayor for Bath and North East Somerset. However, the majority of voters in the district opted to stay with the current system.

Parishes
The area of the city of Bath, which was formerly the Bath county borough, is unparished. The fifteen electoral wards of Bath are: Bathwick, Combe Down, Kingsmead, Lambridge, Lansdown, Moorlands, Newbridge, Odd Down, Oldfield Park, Southdown, Twerton, Walcot, Westmoreland, Weston and Widcombe & Lyncombe. These wards are co-extensive with the city, except that Newbridge includes also two parishes beyond the city boundary.

Demography

170,238 people live in the area and approximately half live in the City of Bath making it 12 times more densely populated than the rest of the area.

According to the UK Government's 2001 census, Bath, together with North East Somerset, which includes areas around Bath as far as the Chew Valley, has a population of 169,040, with an average age of 39.9 (the national average being 38.6). According to the same statistics, the district is overwhelmingly populated by people of a white ethnic background at 97.2% – significantly higher than the national average of 90.9%. Other non-white ethnic groups in the district, in order of population size, are multiracial at 1%, Asian at 0.5% and black at 0.5% (the national averages are 1.3%, 4.6% and 2.1%, respectively).

The district is largely Christian at 71%, with no other religion reaching more than 0.5%. These figures generally compare with the national averages, though the non-religious, at 19.5%, are significantly more prevalent than the national 14.8%. Although Bath is known for the restorative powers of its waters, and only 7.4% of the population describe themselves as "not healthy" in the last 12 months, compared to a national average of 9.2%; only 15.8% of the inhabitants say they have had a long-term illness, as against 18.2% nationally.

Economy

This is a chart of trend of regional gross value added of North and North East Somerset and South Gloucestershire at current basic prices published by Office for National Statistics with figures in millions of British Pounds Sterling.

Settlements

The major towns and villages in the district are:
Bath
Bathampton
Peasedown
Keynsham
Midsomer Norton
Paulton
Radstock
Saltford
Chew Magna

Transport
Bath and North East Somerset is also served by the A37 and A368 trunk roads, and a network of smaller roads.

Bath is connected to Bristol and the sea by the River Avon, navigable via locks by small boats. The river was connected to the River Thames and London by the Kennet & Avon Canal in 1810 via Bath Locks; this waterway – closed for many years, but restored in the last years of the 20th century – is now popular with narrow boat users. Bath is on National Cycle Route 4, with one of Britain's first cycleways, the Bristol & Bath Railway Path, to the west, and an eastern route toward London on the canal towpath.

Bath is served by the Bath Spa railway station (designed by Isambard Kingdom Brunel), which has regular connections to London Paddington, Bristol Temple Meads, Cardiff Central, Swansea, Exeter St Davids, Plymouth and Penzance (see Great Western Main Line), and also Westbury, Warminster, Salisbury, Southampton Central, Portsmouth Harbour and Brighton (see Wessex Main Line). Services are provided by Great Western Railway. There are suburban stations on the main line at Oldfield Park and Keynsham which have a limited commuter service to Bristol. Green Park station was once operated by the Somerset & Dorset Joint Railway, whose line (always steam driven) climbed over the Mendip Hills and served many towns and villages on its  run to Bournemouth; this example of an English rural line was closed by the Beeching cuts in March 1966, with few remaining signs of its existence, but its Bath station building survives and now houses a number of shops.

The 2004 Bristol/Bath to South Coast Study was commissioned as a result of the de-trunking in 1999 of the A36/A46 trunk road network from Bath to Southampton.

Education 

State-funded schools are organised within the district of Bath and North East Somerset. A review of Secondary Education in Bath was started in 2007, primarily to reduce surplus provision and reduce the number of single-sex secondary schools in Bath, and to access capital funds available through the government's Building Schools for the Future programme.

The city contains one further education college, Bath College, and several sixth forms as part of both state, private, and public schools. In England, on average in 2006, 45.8% of pupils gained 5 grades A-C including English and Maths; for Bath and North East Somerset pupils taking GCSE at 16 it is 52.0%. Special needs education is provided by Three Ways School.

Bath has two universities. The University of Bath was established in 1966. It is known, academically, for the physical sciences, mathematics, architecture, management and technology.

Bath Spa University was first granted degree-awarding powers in 1992 as a university college (Bath Spa University College), before being granted university status in August 2005. It has schools in Art and Design, Education, English and Creative Studies, Historical and Cultural Studies, Music and the Performing Arts, and Social Sciences.
It also awards degrees through colleges such as Weston College in nearby Weston-super-Mare.

Sports

Bath Rugby plays at the Recreation Ground. Bath Cricket Club play at the North Parade cricket ground next door to the Recreation Ground.

Bath City F.C. is the major football team in Bath city but there are also clubs in the surrounding areas such as; Paulton Rovers F. C., Bishop Sutton A.F.C., Radstock Town F.C. and Welton Rovers F.C.

The Bath Half Marathon is run annually through the city streets, with over 10,000 runners. Bath also has a thriving cycling community, with places for biking including Royal Victoria Park, 'The Tumps' in Odd Down/east, the jumps on top of Lansdown, and Prior Park. Places for biking near Bath include Brown's Folly in Batheaston and Box Woods, in Box.

There are sport and leisure centres in Bath, Keynsham the Chew Valley and Midsomer Norton. Much of the surrounding countryside is accessible for walking and both Chew Valley Lake and Blagdon Lake provide extensive fishing under permit from Bristol Water. The River Chew and most of its tributaries also have fishing but this is generally under licences to local angling clubs. Chew Valley Sailing Club is situated on Chew Valley Lake and provides dinghy sailing at all levels and hosts national and international competitions.

Places of interest

There are a total of 72,000 dwellings within the area, 6,408 are listed buildings, classified as of historical or architectural importance, of which 663 are Grade I and 212 are Grade II* and the remainder are Grade II. These include many buildings and areas of Bath such as Lansdown Crescent, the Royal Crescent, The Circus and Pulteney Bridge. Outside the city there are also several historic manor houses such as St Catherine's Court and Sutton Court.

Bath is a major tourist centre and has a range of museums and art galleries including the Victoria Art Gallery, the Museum of East Asian Art, and Holburne Museum of Art, numerous commercial art galleries and antique shops, as well as numerous museums, among them Bath Postal Museum, The Fashion Museum, the Jane Austen Centre, the Herschel Museum of Astronomy and the Roman Baths.

The Radstock Museum details the history of the Somerset coalfield.

The Avon Valley Railway serves Avon Riverside railway station. The Somerset & Dorset Railway Heritage Trust is based at Midsomer Norton railway station.

See also

 List of tourist attractions in Bath
 Grade I listed buildings in Bath and North East Somerset
 Grade II* listed buildings in Bath and North East Somerset
 List of Scheduled Monuments in Bath and North East Somerset
West of England Combined Authority

References

External links

B&NES council

 
Unitary authority districts of England
Avon (county)
Geography of Somerset
Local government districts of South West England